The Twenty-four Filial Exemplars, also translated as The Twenty-four Paragons of Filial Piety, is a classic text of Confucian filial piety written by Guo Jujing during the Yuan dynasty (1260–1368). The text was extremely influential in the medieval Far East and was used to teach Confucian moral values.

Authorship
The text is generally attributed to Guo Jujing but other sources suggested two other possible authors or editors: Guo Shouzheng and Guo Juye.

History
Some of the stories in The Twenty-four Filial Exemplars were taken from other texts such as the Xiaozi Zhuan, Yiwen Leiju, Imperial Readings of the Taiping Era and In Search of the Supernatural.

There were earlier precedents of The Twenty-four Filial Exemplars. A Buddhist bianwen titled Ershisi Xiao Yazuowen, which was among the manuscripts discovered in Dunhuang's Mogao Caves, is the oldest extant text related to The Twenty-four Filial Exemplars. During the Southern Song dynasty, the artist Zhao Zigu drew a painting, Ershisi Xiao Shuhua Hebi, about The Twenty-four Filial Exemplars. During the Yuan dynasty, the scholar Xie Yingfang mentioned in Gui Chao Ji that a certain Wang Dashan once praised The Twenty-four Filial Exemplars and the Classic of Filial Piety. During the Qing dynasty, Wu Zhengxiu mentioned in Ershisi Xiao Gu Ci that the Twenty-four Filial Exemplars were very well known.

After the release of The Twenty-four Filial Exemplars, revised editions of the text and other similar works were published. Some of these include: Riji Gushi Daquan Ershisi Xiao (Complete Diary Stories of the Twenty-four Filial Exemplars), Nü Ershisi Xiao (Female Twenty-four Filial Exemplars), and Nan Nü Ershisi Xiao (Male and Female Twenty-four Filial Exemplars).

The philologist Yang Bojun mentioned the development of The Twenty-four Filial Exemplars in Jingshu Qiantan. After the book was compiled by Guo Shouzheng during the Yuan dynasty, a new illustrated edition with drawings by Wang Kexiao was released, and this made the book even more popular. Towards the end of the Qing dynasty, Zhang Zhidong and others edited and expanded the book and released it as Bai Xiao Tu Shuo (Illustrated Hundred Stories of Filial Piety).

Evaluation

The concept of filial piety has played a strong role in Chinese culture since ancient times. There was also a tradition of filial mourning, in which a person had to temporarily put aside whatever he/she was doing when his/her parent(s) died and mourn for three years. There were sayings such as "When a ruler wants a subject to die, the subject must die; when a father wants a son to die, the son must die", and "A loyal subject should be sought from a family with filial sons."

However, some stories in The Twenty-four Filial Exemplars are regarded as negative examples in contemporary times. These stories include the extreme example of Guo Ju deciding to kill his son so that he could free up his son's share of the family's food consumption to feed his mother. The negative examples also include stories in which the protagonist harms himself in the process of fulfilling filial piety, such as Wu Meng allowing mosquitoes to suck his blood in the hope that they would not bother his parents, and Wang Xiang lying naked on ice to thaw the ice so that he could catch fish for his mother.

Some stories have been heavily criticised and even deemed contrary to Confucian principles. One example is the story of Cai Shun being rewarded by the Chimei rebels for his filial piety. The story paints the rebels in a positive light when they actually violated the Confucian virtue of loyalty to one's country. Another example is the story of Laolaizi behaving childishly to amuse his parents. The modern writer Lu Xun said that Laolaizi's story is "an insult to the ancients, and a bad influence on future generations".

The Exemplars

References

External links
 English translation of The Twenty-four Filial Exemplars

Confucian texts
Yuan dynasty literature
 
Filial piety